Lycinus frayjorge is a mygalomorph spider of Chile, named after its type locality: Parque Nacional Fray Jorge, Limarí, Region IV (Coquimbo). The female spermathecae are most similar to those of L. gajardoi, which differs by the less numerous maxillary cuspules, the lighter scopula IV, and the presence of pseudopreening combs.

Description
Female: total length ; cephalothorax length , width ; cephalic region length , width ; fovea width ; medial ocular quadrangle length , width ; labium length , width ; sternum length , width . Its cephalic region is short, wide and convex. Its labium possesses 1 cuspule. A serrula is absent and its sternum is reborded. Chelicerae: rastellum is formed by numerous small, short and blunt cusps. Its cephalothorax is yellowish-brown, with dark striae, while its legs are a uniformly yellowish-brown colour and the dorsal abdomen is dark-brown, with a chevron as in L. epipiptus, but almost hidden by a dark pubescence and pigmentation.

Distribution and Behaviour
Only from its type locality, Region IV (Coquimbo Region). They are found in a habitat similar to that described for Chaco socos, at the side of a ravine, from burrows closed with the typical double flap.

See also
Spider anatomy
List of Nemesiidae species
Regions of Chile

References

External links

ADW entry

Nemesiidae
Spiders of South America
Spiders described in 1995
Endemic fauna of Chile